Taipei School in Ho Chi Minh City (TSHCMC;) is a Taiwanese (Republic of China) international school in District 7, Ho Chi Minh City, Vietnam.

TSHCMC, which serves kindergarten through high school, was established on 27 October 1997. As of 2016 it has about 60 teachers, 450 ROC national students, and 60 students of other nationalities.

See also

 Vietnam–Taiwan relations

References

External links
Taipei School in Ho Chi Minh City 
Introduction (English)

Taiwanese international schools
International schools in Ho Chi Minh City
1997 establishments in Vietnam
Educational institutions established in 1997
Taiwan–Vietnam relations